This is a list of films produced in Mongolia.

See also 
 Cinema of Mongolia

References

External links 
 Mongolian film at the Internet Movie Database

Mongolia

Films